Tiihonen is a Finnish surname. Notable people with the surname include:

 Pekka Tiihonen (born 1947), Finnish long-distance runner
 Ilpo Tiihonen (1950–2021), Finnish writer
 Cheek (born 1981), the stage name of Jare Henrik Tiihonen, Finnish rapper

Finnish-language surnames